Sergio Di Zio is a Canadian actor. He starred in the television series Flashpoint as Michelangelo "Spike" Scarlatti until the show concluded on December 13, 2012. His other works include The Lookout, Cinderella Man, Senior Trip; the television series This is Wonderland, Northern Town; as a voice actor for the animated series Stoked and Babar and the Adventures of Badou. He also appeared in the stage debut of Léo written by Rosa Labordé for which he received a Dora Award nomination in 2006. Di Zio was recently part of an animated show called Grojband, until the show concluded in May 2015. He more recently has transitioned to short films, however he continues to take on various projects.

Career 
Di Zio is best known for playing Michelangelo Scarlatti, nicknamed "Spike", on the CTV police drama Flashpoint. However, prior to landing his breakthrough role, he had appeared in over 30 movies and TV series.  After making his debut in the 1995 film Senior Trip, Di Zio appeared in a string of telepics including The Wall, Major Crime, Freak City, Rembrandt: Fathers & Sons, and RFK.  Additionally, he guest starred on other Canadian series, such as Murdoch Mysteries, Republic of Doyle, and even played "Ripper" on Stoked for 11 episodes.

Film appearances include Ron Howard's Cinderella Man, Boondock Saints, Flash of Genius, and the Independent Spirit Awards winning The Lookout, playing Deputy Ted. Di Zio has starred in Just Buried, 19 Months and the Peter Wellington film, Luck, winner of the South by Southwest Film Festival.

Sergio's TV movie appearances include Robert Ludlum's Covert One: The Hades Factor, John Stamos' The Wedding Wars and the Fox biopic RFK, where he played Robert F. Kennedy’s adviser and speechwriter Adam Walinsky.

In July 2012, he made a brief appearance in the show The Listener as Spike, the same Spike as in Flashpoint. The episode is Now You See Him.

In 2015, Di Zio starred in the film The Walk as officer Genco.

Filmography

References

External links 
 
 Northern Stars
 CTV.ca biography

Living people
Male actors from Toronto
Canadian male film actors
Canadian people of Italian descent
Canadian male stage actors
Canadian male television actors
Canadian male voice actors
20th-century Canadian male actors
21st-century Canadian male actors
Best Supporting Actor in a Drama Series Canadian Screen Award winners
Year of birth missing (living people)